Mongaup Mountain is a mountain located in the Catskill Mountains of New York west of Frost Valley. Cradle Rock Ridge is located north, and Beaver Kill Range is located east-northeast of Mongaup Mountain.

References

Mountains of Ulster County, New York
Mountains of New York (state)